Ghetma is a village in Rukum district, western Nepal.

Demographics 
The 2011 National Population and Housing Census recorded 4,789: 2,348 men and 2,441 women.

Education 
Students attend Shree Adarsh Higher Secondary School Ghetma, Rukum. Each ward has primary schools including three lower secondary schools.

Geography 
Ghetma is located on the bank of the Thuli Bheri River. The jungle of Ward No.1 contains a locally famous cave called Saattale Guffa.

Administration 
In the past, it was a part of Aathbis DandaGaun VDC which used to occupy two wards.

References

Populated places in Western Rukum District